Moral-Reforma is a Maya archaeological site in Mexico, about 70 miles (113 km) northeast of Palenque.

History
Yuknoom the Great, the ruler of Calakmul, supervised the accession of six-year-old Muwaan Jol, king of Moral Reforma, in 662 CE.  However, in 690 CE this same king was installed under the patronage of K'inich Kan Balam II of Palenque.

References

External links
 Moral-Reforma Archaeological Site

Further reading
 
 

Maya sites in Tabasco